Horea (also known as Micro 16) is a residential district of Satu Mare in Romania. It is named after the Romanian revolutionary Horea also known as Vasile Ursu Nicola.

References

Districts of Satu Mare